During the 2002–03 English football season, Derby County competed in the Football League First Division, following relegation from the FA Premier League the previous season.

Season summary
Derby were expected to make a bid for an immediate return to the Premiership, but struggled all season which resulted in manager John Gregory being sacked in March and replaced by former Ipswich Town manager George Burley, who led the team to a secure but disappointing 18th-place finish.

Kit
Derby retained the previous season's home kit, manufactured by Italian company Erreà and sponsored by Pedigree.

Final league table

Results
Derby County's score comes first

Legend

Football League First Division

FA Cup

League Cup

Players

First-team squad
Squad at end of season

Left club during season

Transfers

In
 Paul Ritchie – Manchester City, loan
 Tommy Mooney – Birmingham City, loan
 Nick Chadwick – Everton, loan

Out
 Darryl Powell – released (later joined Birmingham City on 12 September)
 Brian O'Neil – released, 27 November (later joined Preston North End)
 Fiachra McArdle – released, 27 November
 Deon Burton – Portsmouth, 11 December, £250,000
 Mart Poom – Sunderland, 10 January, £2,500,000
 Chris Riggott and Malcolm Christie– Middlesbrough, 31 January, £3,000,000 combined
 Danny Higginbotham – Southampton, 31 January, £1,500,000
 Bjørn Otto Bragstad – released (later joined SW Bregenz)
 Horacio Carbonari – released (later joined Rosario Central)

Loan out
 Deon Burton – Portsmouth, 9 August
 François Grenet – Rennes, 29 August
 Mart Poom – Sunderland, 15 November
 Marvin Robinson – Tranmere Rovers, 29 November

References

Notes

Derby County F.C. seasons
Derby County